Paavo Rantanen (born 28 February 1934) is a Finnish former Foreign Ministry official who was briefly the Minister for Foreign Affairs.

Rantanen was an undersecretary of foreign trade before becoming the Finnish ambassador to Washington. He worked in the Ministry of Foreign Affairs for thirty years from 1958 to 1988. He also served on the Nokia Executive Board 1988–1995, until he became a non-aligned Minister of Foreign Affairs in the Esko Aho's cabinet following the resignation of Heikki Haavisto. Rantanen was the Minister of Foreign Affairs for 70 days and was forced to resign after the 1995 parliamentary elections.

References 

1934 births
Living people
People from Jyväskylä
Ministers for Foreign Affairs of Finland
Nokia people
Ambassadors of Finland to the United States
Permanent Representatives of Finland to the United Nations